Tun Leong Yew Koh (22 August 1888 – 12 January 1963) was a Malayan politician who served as the 1st Yang di-Pertua Negeri of Malacca from the independence of the Federation of Malaya in August 1957 to August 1959 and Minister of Health from 1955 to 1956, Minister of Health and Social Welfare from 1956 to 1957 and Minister of Justice from 1959 to his death in January 1963. Being a Kuomintang member himself and serving under the Republic of China government from 1932 and later become the leader of Overseas Chinese Anti-Japanese Army branch in Perak from 1942 until 1945, he is one of the founder of the Malayan Chinese Association (MCA) in 1949 and the party first secretary-general.

Early life and background 
Born in Salak Utara, Sungai Siput, Perak on 22 August 1888, Leong was the son of Leong Yew Teen, who was responsible in developing Salak Utara.

He went to Canton for his early education. At age 13, he came back to Malaya from China and studied in Anglo-Chinese School Ipoh and St Xavier's Institution, Penang. At age 16, he joined Tongmenghui Singapore.

He went to the University of London in 1908, studying economics, sociology, political science and law. He graduated in 1912 with an LLB.

Further career

Malayan bar 
He was called to the bar in 1920 and served as an advocate and solicitor in the Federated Malay States (FMS) and was also a member of the FMS Bar Committee until his resignation in 1932.

Republic of China 
In 1932, Leong returned to China and served the Chinese government as counsellor of the Ministry of Railways, legal adviser to the Executive Yuan, members of Overseas Chinese Affairs Commission, adviser to the Treaty Commission of the Ministry of Foreign Affairs and inspector of China consulates in the Philippines, Dutch East Indies, Malaya and South Africa from 1935. He was also the senior commissioner for China in the Sino-British Joint Boundary Commission for the Investigation of the Southern Section of the Undelimited Yunnan-Burma Boundary from 1935 until 1937. He became counsellor to ambassador Chen Kung Po, the Chinese emissary to Rome in 1938. He then left the central government to join the Yunnan provincial government as development commissioner of the Second Frontier District of Yunnan.

War-time era

Resistance activities in Malaya 
Through the ensuing Japanese Malayan campaign during the World War II, Leong is the leader of the Malayan Kuomintang-guerrilla branch of the Overseas Chinese Anti-Japanese Army (OCAJA) in Perak where the group controlled the upper portion of the Perak River Valley. After the war ended and subsequent Japanese surrender, a negotiation was held between him and the British Malayan authorities where he agreed for the OCAJA under his authority being absorbed into the national Special Constabulary in 1947 to fight alongside the British against the Communist-influenced Malayan National Liberation Army (MNLA).

Later and final years

Political career in Malaya 
On 27 February 1949, Tan Cheng Lock founded the Malayan Chinese Association (MCA) along with Leong and Colonel H. S. Lee. Leong became the first Secretary-General of MCA.

He was appointed as the Yang di-Pertua Negeri of Malacca on 31 August 1957, and served until 30 August 1959. In 1958, he was awarded a federal title of Tun, bestowed by DYMM Seri Paduka Baginda Yang di-Pertuan Agong of Malaya. He was then appointed as the Justice Minister of Malaya in 1959. He died on 12 January 1963 in Petaling Jaya, Selangor.

He was the first Chinese to be appointed as the Yang di-Pertua Negeri in any of the Malayan states. As of 2015, he is considered as the only Chinese ever appointed as the Yang di-Pertua Negeri in any of the Malaysian states.

Honour

Honour of Malaya 
  : 
 Grand Commander of the Order of the Defender of the Realm (SMN) – Tun (1958)

References 

1888 births
1963 deaths
People from Perak
Malaysian people of Chinese descent
Members of the Dewan Negara
Malaysian people of Cantonese descent
Malaysian Chinese Association politicians
British Malaya lawyers
Alumni of the University of London
Yang di-Pertua Negeri of Malacca
Government ministers of Malaysia
Grand Commanders of the Order of the Defender of the Realm
Health ministers of Malaysia
Justice ministers of Malaysia